Rugby union in the British Virgin Islands is a minor but growing sport. They currently have around 440 registered players.

Governing body 
The governing body is BVI Rugby Football Union, which is affiliated to the IRB and the North America Caribbean Rugby Association.

History 
The British first introduced the game to the islands, and for a number of years it was mainly played by expatriates. Now it has some uptake by the local population.

Games against visiting ships, and touring sides are common, as well as against neighbouring Caribbean islands.

The British Virgin Islands compete in the Caribbean Championship, a tournament which includes Trinidad and Tobago, Bermuda, Martinique, the Cayman Islands, Jamaica, the Bahamas, Antigua and Guyana.

See also 
 British Virgin Islands national rugby union team

External links
 British Virgin Islands on IRB.com
 official union page
 NAWIRA BVI Page
 British Virgin Islands on rugbydata.com
 Boost for Rugby 7s in the Americas & Caribbean
 Archives du Rugby: British Virgin Islands

References